Herbert Stern may refer to:

Herbert Stern, 1st Baron Michelham (1851–1919), British financier and philanthropist
Herbert Jay Stern (born 1936), American lawyer and judge